Chelsea F.C. Development Squad are the development team of Chelsea Football Club. They play in the Premier League 2, which is the top level of reserve football in England. They were the champions in the 2013–14 and 2019–20 seasons. The team mainly consists of under-21 players at the club, although senior players occasionally feature, when recovering from injuries or otherwise not in the first team. The under-21 team is managed by Mark Robinson and the under-18 team is managed by Ed Brand.

Chelsea F.C. Academy is the under-18 team of Chelsea Football Club. It is a member of the Professional U18 Development League. They have won the FA Youth Cup nine times, including five consecutive titles between 2014 and 2018. The academy has produced many successful players such as the brothers Ron and Allan Harris, Peter Bonetti, Bobby Tambling, Barry Bridges, Bert Murray, John Hollins, Peter Osgood, Ray Wilkins, Graeme Le Saux, Bobby Smith, Terry Venables, Jimmy Greaves, John Terry, Mason Mount, and Reece James. Chelsea are the only English club to reach the final of the UEFA Youth League, winning it twice in four final appearances.

Neil Bath, who is the Head of Youth Development, is responsible for the day-to-day operation of the academy.

Until the 2019–20 season, the development team played their home games at Aldershot Town's Recreation Ground. The under-18 team play their home games at the club's Cobham Training Centre in Cobham, Surrey. Both teams occasionally use the club's home ground Stamford Bridge for important matches.

Current squads

Development squad

U19 and U18 squad

Management team

Notable Academy graduates
Players who have at least 10 appearances for Chelsea or represented a country at full international level. Players who still play for Chelsea, including those that are currently out on loan to other clubs, are in bold.

Before WW2

 David Calderhead Jr.
 George Pearson
 Harry Bearryman
 Ron Greenwood
 Désiré Bastin
 Tommy Law
 Bill Robertson

1950s

 Bobby Smith
 Peter Brabrook
 Les Allen
 John Compton
 Mel Scott
 Terry Bradbury
 Tony Nicholas
 Derek Gibbs
 David Cliss
 Jimmy Greaves
 Mike Harrison
 Micky Block
 Barry Bridges
 Bobby Tambling
 Ken Shellito
 Peter Bonetti
 Dick Whittaker
 Gerry Baker

1960s

 Ron Harris
 Terry Venables
 Allan Harris
 Bert Murray
 Dennis Butler
 Dennis Brown
 Tony Currie
 John Dunn
 Peter Houseman
 John Hollins
 Peter Osgood
 Barry Lloyd
 Alan Hudson
 John Boyle
 Stewart Houston

1970s

 Gary Stanley
 Steve Sherwood
 Gary Locke
 Brian Bason
 Graham Wilkins
 Ray Wilkins
 John Sparrow
 Teddy Maybank
 Steve Wicks
 Tommy Langley
 Ray Lewington
 Clive Walker
 Trevor Aylott
 Gary Johnson
 John Sitton
 Lee Frost
 John Bumstead
 Micky Nutton
 David Stride
 Mike Fillery
 Gary Chivers
 Kevin Hales
 Colin Pates
 Peter Rhoades-Brown
 Steve Finnieston
 Ian Britton

1980s

 Carlton Palmer
 Dale Jasper
 Steve Francis
 Keith Dublin
 Keith Jones
 Robert Isaac
 Colin West
 David Lee
 Jason Cundy
 Graeme Le Saux
 Damian Matthew
 Graham Stuart
 John Millar
 Billy Dodds
 Craig Burley
 Paul Bodin
 Gareth Hall

1990s

 Eddie Newton
 Andy Myers
 Neil Shipperley
 Michael Duberry
 Mark Nicholls
 Paul Hughes
 Jody Morris
 Jon Harley
 John Terry
 Samuele Dalla Bona
 Frank Sinclair
 Junior Mendes
 Muzzy Izzet
 Nathan Blake

2000s

 Yves Ma-Kalambay
 Gaël Kakuta
 Carlton Cole
 Jack Cork
 Ryan Bertrand
 Momodou Ceesay
 Robert Huth
 Emmanuel Sarki
 Jóhann Berg Guðmundsson
 Ben Sahar
 Fabio Borini
 Jermaine Beckford
 Anthony Grant
 Shaun Cummings
 Mbark Boussoufa
 Bradley Woods-Garness
 Jeffrey Bruma
 Patrick van Aanholt
 James Younghusband
 Phil Younghusband
 Neil Etheridge
 Jeffrey Ntuka
 Michael Modubi
 Dean Furman
 Warren Cummings
 Liam Bridcutt
 Michael Mancienne
 Andy King

2010s

 Richard Bakary
 Bertrand Traoré
 Faiq Bolkiah
 Iké Ugbo
 Victorien Angban
 Jérémie Boga
 Andreas Christensen
 Josh McEachran
 Nathaniel Chalobah
 Dominic Solanke
 Declan Rice
 Ruben Loftus-Cheek
 Fikayo Tomori
 Tammy Abraham
 Callum Hudson-Odoi
 Mason Mount
 Trevoh Chalobah
 Reece James
 Conor Gallagher
 Marc Guéhi
 Jamal Musiala
 Tariq Lamptey
 Louie Annesley
 Aliu Djaló
 Kasey Palmer
 Mukhtar Ali
 Rohan Ince
 Nathan Aké
 Ola Aina
 George Saville
 Billy Gilmour
 Aziz Deen-Conteh
 Kevin Wright
 Will Donkin
 Michael Kedman
 Daniel Phillips
 Gökhan Töre
 Chris Mepham

2020s

 Armando Broja
 Lucas Bergström
 Omari Hutchinson
 Sam McClelland

Young Player of the Year

Academy Player of the Year

Academy graduates in Premier League era (1992–present)
Academy graduates who have played for Chelsea, including those that are currently out on loan to other clubs, are in bold.

Honours

Reserves Team
U21 Premier League / Premier League 2
 Winners (2): 2013–14, 2019–20
The Football Combination
 Winners (11): 1948–49, 1954–55, 1957–58, 1959–60, 1960–61, 1964–65, 1974–75, 1976–77, 1984–85, 1990–91, 1993–94
Premier Reserve League – National Champions
 Winners (1): 2010–11
Premier Reserve League – Southern Champions
 Winners (1): 2010–11
London Challenge Cup
 Winners (5): 1919–20, 1926–27, 1949–50, 1959–60, 1960–61
Metropolitan League
 Winners (3): 1954–55, 1956–57, 1957–58

Academy Team
UEFA Youth League
 Winners (2): 2014–15, 2015–16
U18 Premier League – National Champions
 Winners (2): 2016–17, 2017–18
U18 Premier League – Southern Champions
 Winners (4): 2014–15, 2015–16, 2016–17, 2017–18
FA Youth Cup
 Winners (9): 1959–60, 1960–61, 2009–10, 2011–12, 2013–14, 2014–15, 2015–16, 2016–17, 2017–18
U18 Premier League Cup
 Winners (2): 2017–18, 2021–22
U16 Premier League Cup
 Winners (1): 2018–19
Southern Junior Floodlight Cup
 Winners (5):  1955–56, 1959–60, 1960–61, 1961–62, 1963–64

South East Counties League
 Winners (10): 1954–55, 1956–57, 1957–58, 1958–59, 1959–60, 1960–61, 1961–62, 1962–63, 1973–74, 1983–84 

South East Counties League Cup
 Winners (11): 1952–53, 1953–54, 1956–57, 1957–58, 1958–59, 1962–63, 1964–65, 1972–73, 1973–74, 1983–84, 1986–87

References

External links
 About the Academy at Chelsea F.C. official website 
 Why Chelsea could finally be reaping the rewards of their outstanding academy – These Football Times (2017)

Professional Development League
Under-21s and Academy
Football academies in England
Eastern Counties Football League
Metropolitan League
1948 establishments in England
Premier League International Cup
UEFA Youth League teams
NextGen series
London League (football)